Pat Ballard, born Francis Drake Ballard (June 19, 1899 – October 26, 1960), was an American songwriter, producer, music editor and author. He was born in Troy, Pennsylvania, to Frank Ballard, a jeweller-optician, and Lucille, a soprano. He was the great-great-grandson of Orrin P. Ballard, one of the pioneers of the region.

He was married to Hilda Gramlich, a dress designer. He died of a cardiac arrest at the Medical Arts Centre in New York City, New York, in 1960.

Songs
He composed a number of songs with the most popular being "Mr. Sandman" and "(Oh Baby Mine) I Get So Lonely".
"Mr. Sandman" is owned by Paul McCartney's license company, but the company is currently trying to get it sold back to Pat Ballard's family.

He was a member of the American Society of Composers, Authors and Publishers.

References

Songwriters from Pennsylvania
1899 births
1960 deaths
20th-century American composers